James or Jimmy Lydon may refer to:

Jimmy Lydon (1923–2022), American actor
James Lydon (historian) (1928–2013), Irish medievalist and academic
Jimmy Lydon, vocalist with the Bollock Brothers

See also
Lydon (surname)